Blue Moses is an album by American jazz pianist and composer Randy Weston featuring performances recorded in 1972 and released on the CTI label.

Reception

AllMusic states: "Recorded in 1972, Blue Moses, the most commercially successful album in pianist/composer Randy Weston's catalog remains one of his most controversial due to his conflicted feelings about the final product, which he feels is too polished and too far from his original intent for the project. Indeed, appearing on Creed Taylor's CTI imprint was an almost certain guarantee of polished production.... No matter how Weston ultimately feels about Blue Moses, this date succeeds on all levels. Creating a commercially viable recording from the elements presented must not have been easy, but Taylor rose to the occasion and delivered a grooving beauty of an album without compromising Weston's genius".

Track listing
All compositions by Randy Weston.
 "Ifrane" – 5:16
 "Ganawa (Blue Moses)" – 12:29
 "Night in Medina" – 6:50
 "Marrakesh Blues" – 12:17
Recorded at Van Gelder Studio in Englewood Cliffs, New Jersey, in March and April 1972.

Personnel
Randy Weston – electric piano
Freddie Hubbard – trumpet
John Frosk, Alan Rubin, Marvin Stamm – trumpet, flugelhorn
Garnett Brown, Warren Covington – trombone
Wayne Andre – trombone, baritone horn
Paul Faulise – bass trombone
James Buffington, Brooks Tillotson – French horn
Grover Washington, Jr. – tenor saxophone
Hubert Laws – flute, alto flute, bass flute, piccolo
Romeo Penque – clarinet, flute, alto flute, bass flute, piccolo, oboe, English horn
George Marge – clarinet, flute, alto flute, bass flute, English horn
David Horowitz – synthesizer
Ron Carter, Vishnu Bill Wood – bass
Billy Cobham – drums
Phil Kraus, Airto Moreira, Azzedin Weston – percussion
Madame Meddah – vocals
Don Sebesky – arranger, conductor
Rudy Van Gelder – engineer
Bob Ciano – design

References

CTI Records albums
Randy Weston albums
1972 albums
Albums produced by Creed Taylor
Albums arranged by Don Sebesky
Albums recorded at Van Gelder Studio